Kelly Taylor is a character from the Beverly Hills, 90210 franchise.

Kelly Taylor may also refer to:
 Kelly Taylor (EastEnders), a character from EastEnders
 Kelly Taylor, member of DCappella
 Kelly Taylor, a character in From Justin to Kelly
 Kelly Taylor, a character in Burning Bright